Staritsky (masculine), Staritskaya (feminine), or Staritskoye (neuter) may refer to:

Places

Staritsky, Russia (Staritskaya, Staritskoye), several rural localities in Russia
Staritsky District, a district of Tver Oblast, Russia
, the location of Magadan, Magadan Oblast, Russia

People
Euphrosinia Staritskaya (died 1569), Russian noblewoman
 (1839–1909), Russian counter admiral, explorer, and hydrographer

See also
Staritsa
Starytsky, the Ukrainian variant of the surname

ru:Старицкий